Jean Luc Rosat (6 September 1953 – 2 April 2021) was a Brazilian volleyball player. He competed at the 1976 Summer Olympics and the 1980 Summer Olympics.

Rosat died at age 67 due to complications from COVID-19.

References

External links

1953 births
2021 deaths
Brazilian men's volleyball players
Olympic volleyball players of Brazil
Volleyball players at the 1976 Summer Olympics
Volleyball players at the 1980 Summer Olympics
Sportspeople from Montevideo
Deaths from the COVID-19 pandemic in Rio de Janeiro (state)
Pan American Games silver medalists for Brazil
Pan American Games medalists in volleyball
Volleyball players at the 1975 Pan American Games
Medalists at the 1975 Pan American Games